James J. "Jimmy" Toner (born July 7, 1940, in Philadelphia, Pennsylvania) is an American Thoroughbred racehorse trainer.

At age nineteen in April 1960 he got his first win as a trainer, making him the youngest to ever win a Thoroughbred horse race in State of New York. He won the 1999 Breeders' Cup Filly & Mare Turf with Soaring Softly and would be named that year's American Champion Female Turf Horse.

References
Jimmy Toner - NTRA
JJ Toner Racing Stable

1940 births
Living people
American horse trainers
Sportspeople from Philadelphia